Nina Rauh Morrison (born 1970) is an American lawyer who serves as a United States district judge of the United States District Court for the Eastern District of New York. As part of her work for the Innocence Project, she had been lead or co-counsel in cases that have freed more than 30 wrongly convicted people from prison and death row.

Education 

Morrison was born in 1970 in New York City. She received a Bachelor of Arts from Yale University in 1992 and a Juris Doctor from the New York University School of Law in 1998.

Career 

Morrison began her legal career as a law clerk for Judge Pierre Leval of the United States Court of Appeals for the Second Circuit. From 1992 to 1995, Morrison was an investigator with the California appellate projects, which represents California's death row inmates in post-conviction proceedings.

She was then an associate at Emery, Cuti, Brinckerhoff & Abady from 1999 to 2001 focusing on civil rights litigation. She joined the Innocence Project in 2002 and has since worked as executive director and senior litigation counsel. As an attorney at the Innocence Project, Morrison has been lead or co-counsel in cases that have freed more than 30 wrongly convicted people from prison and death row. From 2002 to 2016, she was an adjunct professor of law at the Benjamin N. Cardozo School of Law of Yeshiva University.

Federal judicial service 
On December 15, 2021, President Joe Biden nominated Morrison to serve as a United States district judge of the United States District Court for the Eastern District of New York. President Biden nominated Morrison to the seat vacated by Judge Dora Irizarry, who assumed senior status on January 26, 2020. On February 16, 2022, a hearing on her nomination was held before the Senate Judiciary Committee. During her hearing, Morrison was questioned by several Republican senators over her understanding of criminal statutes and her past support for progressive prosecutors.  On March 10, 2022, her nomination was reported out of committee by a 12–10 vote. On May 24, 2022, the United States Senate invoked cloture on her nomination by a 50–41 vote. On June 8, 2022, her nomination was confirmed by a 53–46 vote. She received her judicial commission on August 11, 2022.

Personal life 
Morrison's father, Alan Morrison, is a lawyer and academic who is the Public Interest Dean of the George Washington University Law School. Morrison is the second openly LGBTQ judge on the U.S. District Court for the Eastern District of New York.

See also 
 List of LGBT jurists in the United States

References

External links 
 

1970 births
Living people
20th-century American women lawyers
20th-century American lawyers
21st-century American judges
21st-century LGBT people
21st-century American women lawyers
21st-century American lawyers
21st-century American women judges
Cardozo School of Law faculty
Judges of the United States District Court for the Eastern District of New York
Lawyers from New York City
LGBT judges
LGBT lawyers
New York University School of Law alumni
United States district court judges appointed by Joe Biden
Yale University alumni